Carl Francis Pilat (1876–1933), the nephew of Ignatz Anton Pilát, was an organizing member of the firm of Hinchman & Pilat, then landscape architect for the city parks 1913–1918. While with the city, Carl Pilat designed Astoria Park, the Telewan project (later named Jacob Riis Park) in Queens, both around 1913, and redesigns of Union Square and Isham, Gaynor memorial and Silver Lake parks. Pilat drew landscape designs for estates of C. H. Dodge, Spencer Trask, E. M. Shepard, E. K. Cone and the Baroness von Zimmerman, some of the gardens at what later became the Reeves-Reed Arboretum in Summit, New Jersey, and the Theodore Vail memorial in Parsippany, New Jersey.

Early life and education 
Pilat was born on August 19, 1876, in Ossining, New York. he received an AB from the College of Agriculture of Cornell University in 1900.

Career 
He worked as a landscape architect of the New York City Parks Department for five years. When work on Central Park slowed down, Pilat became the chief landscape gardener of the city of New York.  He planned improvements for many parks, including Washington Square Park, Battery Park, New York City Hall Park, Mount Morris and Prospect Parks.  Later he designed numerous estates in New Jersey, Long Island and in Westchester County, New York. In 1914 Pilat completed the plans for a park along the shore of the East River at Astoria.

Memberships 
Pilat was a Fellow of the American Society of Landscape Architects.

Personal life and death 
He died on May 26, 1933, in Hasbrouck Heights, New Jersey.

References 

1876 births
1933 deaths
American landscape architects
American landscape and garden designers
Cornell University alumni